Shreenath Mhaskoba is Kaal bhairava an Avatar of the Hindu deity Shiva.
The clan deity of many Hindus, the worship of Kaala Bhairava as Shreenath Mhaskoba was popularized by the caste. He is also worshipped by tribal and pastoral people at, Mhaswad, [Borban] and [Sonari].

Legend
Kamlaji Dhangar, a cowherd, lived in the village of Veer. He escorted his herd, regularly to graze the greener pastures of Sonari and Borban villages. Sonari village, in Belgaum district has been known for its ancient Bhairav Temple. At his sojourn in Sonari, Kamlaji who was an ardent devotee of Lord Bhairava, would secure his cattle in a pen and visit the Lord's temple. He would perform the deity's ablutions, decorate the deity with flowers and leaves from the tarwad shrub. After offering obeisance, Kamlaji would offer a piece of his bhakri to the god. This had become a ritual for Kamlaji. Later ahead in Borban, Kamlaji would secure the cattle in a barn. Find a quiet place to meditate and travel astrally to worship his deity at Sonari, thus continuing his worship without interruptions. After the worship Kamlaji would return to his place of meditation at dawn. This too had become a part of his worship.

Eventually, the residents of Sonari village took notice of the fact that someone visited their deity at night and the dawn. Determined to track who this unknown visitor was, the villagers set up a night watch. Unaware, of this happening, Kamlaji got ready to set for journey to Sonari. At that moment, Lord Bhairava intervened and forbade Kamlaji from visiting Sonari and its temple, fearing that the villagers would harm his beloved devotee. However, Kamlaji who was austere in his worship, replied that he would rather die at the lords feet from the beatings of the villagers than skip worship. The lord was in a dilemma and requested Kamlaji to stay away from the temple and that he, the lord would himself come to visit Kamlaji. To which Kamlaji asked, how would he know the lord has visited? The lord told Kamlaji that a barren, old tree would sprout green new leaves to mark his arrival. Thus convinced Kamlaji decided to stay back and do as the lord suggested. Kamlaji waited till nightfall for the lord to appear, but the lord did not appear. Restless by now, Kamlaji decided to proceed to the village temple and perform worship.

No sooner than Kamlaji decided to leave, a huge snakes with 5 heads appeared amongst the cows. The giant snake coiled around an infertile cow, which then started producing milk and with four of its heads, the snake suckled the cows milk while the fifth head swayed vigilant and majestic in the air. Kamlaji darted towards the barn to see what had scared the other cows. Kamlaji was terrified by what he saw, and began wondering if it was the lord who had arrived as promised. When he turned his attention to a nearby barren tree, the tree miraculously sprouted leaves. Taking this as the cue, Kamlaji quickly offered his turban as a seat for the lord. To which the lord gladly obliged. Kamlaji then proceeded to perform his worship ritual. This association of the lord and Kamlaji remained inconspicuous for 12 years. However, one fine day a villager sneaked into the barn and witnessed this peculiar event. He then ran and tattled the secret to Kamlaji's father. Worried that his son had sought to blackmagic and was petting a giant snake, Kamlaji's father confronted him.

Perplexed by the question and unable to decide if he should deride the lord by calling him a pet, or lie to his father about his worship ritual, Kamlaji remained silent. Later on Kamlaji approached the lord for a solution, to which the lord advised Kamlaji to put his snake form in a mound with a hole in it. Kamlaji did as the lord suggested and later convinced his parents that there is nothing unusual happening. Incidentally the mound happened to be in the field of a Raut Mali, who intended to toil his fertile field and reap a rich harvest of crops. Armed with a till and 12 bulls, the field owner asked a toiler and his accomplice to start toiling the field. Kamlaji requested Raut Mali to toil the field but leave the sacred mound untouched. Raut Mali arrogantly refused to pay heed to Kamlaji's word and ordered the field to be tilled.

This angered the lord and within a trice the 12 bulls and 4 sons of Kamlaji fell dead on the ground. One of the son who manage to escape screamed and gathered the villagers.  Soon the Police was summoned to investigate the matter. However, when the policemen arrived on the spot they found beheaded goats instead of 4 sons.  At that instance the spirit of the lord possessed Kamlaji and spoke to villagers and policeman, it announced that Kamlaji was a beloved devotee of himself and that the villagers has brought upon the wrath of the lord by not listening to Kamlaji. However, since Kamlaji did not even hesitate to sacrifice his own sons to the lord, the lord was pleased and agreed to restore their lives.  The lineage of these 5 sons are well known today as Shingade, Tarde, Burungale, Vhatkar and Dhawan. Further pleased by Kamlaji's devotions, the lord promised to dwell in the Veer Village henceforth. Thus the lord Mhaskoba and incarnation of bhairav came to be worshiped by the villagers and other folks all around Maharashtra.

Further ahead of Kamlaji's time, yet another ardent devotee called "Tulaji Badade Patil" from Kodit Budruk village, of Purandhar Taluka, Pune district earned the blessings of Mhaskoba Maharaj.  As a result, his village is always venerated during the annual veer Mhaskoba Maharaj pilgrimage, held every February (Magh Pournima).

Millions of devotees who have experienced the blessings of Mhaskoba Maharaj, testify that worshiping Mhaskoba Maharaj with utmost devotion fulfills all their wishes.

Temple
The deity is worshipped at the temple of Veer Mhaskoba situated in Veer village, on the banks of river Purnaganga, 26 km. to the south of a village Saswad.

The temple of Veer Mhaskoba situated in Veer village. Veer Mhaskoba is Kaal Shri Nath Mhaskoba Temple veer Shri Nath Mhaskoba Temple
bhairava an Avatar of the Hindu deity Shiva. The Temple is situated on the banks of river Purnaganga, 26 km. to the south of a village Sasvad and around 50 km from Pune. 
The Shri Nath Maskoba is the main devata (god) of Dhangar caste. Shri Nath Maskoba is one of the famous temples near Pune. This temple is situated in Veer village conduit near Shirval on Pune-Satara Road.
  

Regional Hindu gods
Forms of Shiva